The 2016 NASCAR Xfinity Series was the 35th season of the Xfinity Series, a stock car racing series sanctioned by the NASCAR in the United States. The season started at Daytona International Speedway on February 20 and ended at Homestead-Miami Speedway on November 19. Daniel Suárez of Joe Gibbs Racing won the championship, becoming the first non-American to win a title in NASCAR's top 3 divisions.

This was the first year that the Xfinity Series (and the Truck Series) had a playoff system. Just like in the Cup Series, four drivers competed for the title in the final race at Homestead, also the final round of the playoffs. Those drivers are shown below.

Teams and drivers

Complete schedule

Limited schedule

Notes

Changes

Teams
 The Roush Fenway Racing No. 1 and No. 60 cars, driven by Elliott Sadler and Chris Buescher respectively in 2015, would shut down, and Roush would downsize to two full-time teams. Sadler moved full-time to JR Motorsports, while Buescher moved up to the Sprint Cup Series full-time for Front Row Motorsports. The No. 60 team would field part-time with Trevor Bayne, Gray Gaulding and Ricky Stenhouse Jr. driving.
 Chip Ganassi Racing would field a full-time team for Brennan Poole in the No. 48 DC Solar Chevrolet. Poole ran about half the races in the HScott Motorsports with Chip Ganassi No. 42 in 2015. Chad Norris would be the crew chief, after being the crew chief for Bubba Wallace and Ryan Reed for Roush Fenway Racing in 2015.
 SS-Green Light Racing would move up from the Camping World Truck Series to the Xfinity Series with driver Ray Black Jr., crew chief Jason Miller and sponsorship from Scubalife in the No. 07.
 TriStar Motorsports would downsize to two full-time teams, shutting down the No. 8, No. 19 and No. 24. David Starr would remain in the No. 44 with the No. 14 to be announced.
 Kaulig Racing would start a full-time team. Blake Koch would drive the No. 11 LeafFilter Chevrolet with crew chief Chris Rice. Koch drove the No. 8 LeafFilter car for TriStar Motorsports in 2015.
 Rick Ware Racing would field the No. 25 Chevrolet as a second team in celebration of the organization's 25th anniversary.
 B. J. McLeod Motorsports would field two full-time Ford cars: the No. 78, which McLeod would drive, and the No. 99, which various drivers would drive. The cars were purchased from Roush Fenway Racing. The No. 99 team shut down earlier this season, due to points being low, and partnered with Rick Ware Racing to share the No. 15 team points.

Drivers
 2015 NASCAR Camping World Truck Series champion Erik Jones moved to the Xfinity Series full-time for Joe Gibbs Racing in the No. 20. Jones also drove this car part-time in 2015.
 Joe Gibbs Racing renumbered the Daniel Suárez team from the No. 18 to the No. 19.
 Kyle Busch, Matt Tifft, Denny Hamlin, and Bobby Labonte would run the No. 18 for Joe Gibbs Racing in 2016, renumbered from No. 54.
 Justin Allgaier replaced Regan Smith in the JR Motorsports No. 7 with sponsorship from Brandt. Allgaier ran the HScott Motorsports No. 51 in the Sprint Cup Series in 2015. Smith moved back to the Cup Series full-time, driving the No. 7 Tommy Baldwin Racing Chevrolet.
 Elliott Sadler replaced Chase Elliott, who moved up to the Sprint Cup Series, in the JR Motorsports No. 1 (renumbered from No. 9). Sadler ran in the Roush Fenway Racing No. 1 in 2015.
 Chase Elliott, Alex Bowman, Cole Custer, and Kenny Habul joined Kevin Harvick, Josh Berry, and team owner Dale Earnhardt Jr. as drivers of the JR Motorsports No. 88, replacing Kasey Kahne, who drove 6 races in 2015, and Ben Rhodes, who drove 10 races in 2015. Habul drove 3 races for the Joe Gibbs Racing No. 20 in 2015.
 Austin Dillon, Paul Menard, Ben Kennedy, Sam Hornish Jr., A. J. Allmendinger and Michael McDowell replaced Brian Scott in the Richard Childress Racing No. 2. Dillon and Menard both ran part-time in the Childress No. 33 in 2015, while other drivers haven't. Scott moved up to the Sprint Cup Series, driving the No. 44 Richard Petty Motorsports Ford, renumbered from No. 9.
 Brandon Jones will move to the Xfinity Series full-time for Richard Childress Racing in the No. 33. Jones also drove this car part-time with Austin Dillon and Paul Menard in 2015.
 Jeb Burton replaced Dakoda Armstrong in the No. 43 Ford for Richard Petty Motorsports. Burton drove for BK Racing in the Sprint Cup Series in 2015. Burton's season came short due to team's lack of sponsorship.
 Dakoda Armstrong replaced J. J. Yeley in the JGL Racing No. 28 with sponsorship from WinField. Armstrong drove the No. 43 WinField car for Richard Petty Motorsports in 2015.
 Ryan Preece replaced Landon Cassill in the JD Motorsports No. 01. Preece drove five races in the Premium Motorsports No. 98 in the Sprint Cup Series in 2015. Cassill moves to the No. 38 Front Row Motorsports Ford in the Cup Series.
 Harrison Rhodes replaced various drivers in the Obaika Racing No. 97. Rhodes drove the JD Motorsports No. 0 for most of the races in 2015.

Crew chiefs
 Brian Wilson replaced Greg Erwin as the crew chief for Ryan Blaney, Brad Keselowski and Joey Logano in the Team Penske No. 22. He was the race engineer for Brad Keselowski's No. 2 Sprint Cup Series car in 2015. Wilson was replaced by Erwin after Watkins Glen, and later became the No. 12 team crew chief.
 Chris Gabehart replaced Mike Wheeler as crew chief for Erik Jones in the Joe Gibbs Racing No. 20. Gabehart was the race engineer for Denny Hamlin's No. 11 Cup Series car in 2015.
 Scott Graves replaced Eric Phillips as crew chief for Daniel Suárez in the Joe Gibbs Racing No. 19 (renumbered from No. 18). He was the crew chief for the 2015 champion Chris Buescher in the Roush Fenway Racing No. 60 the prior season.
 Kevin Meendering replaced Ernie Cope as crew chief for Elliott Sadler in the JR Motorsports No. 1 (renumbered from No. 9). He was the chief engineer for Dale Earnhardt Jr.'s No. 88 Cup Series car in 2015.
 Richard Childress Racing crew chiefs, Mike Hillman Jr. and Danny Stockman Jr., swapped cars. Hillman Jr. was the crew chief of Brandon Jones in the No. 33 after working with Brian Scott in the No. 2 in 2015. Stockman Jr. moved with Austin Dillon and Paul Menard from the No. 33 to the No. 2.
 Phil Gould replaced Chad Norris as crew chief for Ryan Reed in the Roush Fenway Racing No. 16. He was the crew chief for Roush's Elliott Sadler No. 1 car in 2015.
 Drew Blickensderfer replaced Frank Kerr for Jeb Burton in the Richard Petty Motorsports No. 43. Blickensderfer was the crew chief for 10 races for the Petty No. 9 Sprint Cup team in 2015.
 Frank Kerr replaced Greg Conner as crew chief for David Starr in the TriStar Motorsports No. 44. Kerr was the crew chief for the Richard Petty Motorsports No. 43 in 2015.
 Zach McGowan replaced Wayne Setterington as crew chief for Ryan Preece in the JD Motorsports No. 01. McGowan was the crew chief for Preece in his 5 races for Premium Motorsports in the Sprint Cup series in 2015.
 Brian Berry replaced Gary Cogswell as crew chief for Ross Chastain in the JD Motorsports No. 4.

Rule changes
On January 19, NASCAR announced the introduction of a playoff format similar to the Chase for the Sprint Cup for the Xfinity Series and the Camping World Truck Series. After the 26-race regular season, the top-12 drivers will enter the Round of 12 (Kentucky, Dover and Charlotte), with championship points reset. The top-eight drivers will advance to the Round of 8 (Kansas, Texas and Phoenix). The top-four drivers will qualify to the Championship 4 at Homestead. Race winners will automatically advance to the next round.  Additionally, the 16 drivers who qualified for the 2015 Chase for the Sprint Cup are ineligible to race at Homestead.

NASCAR also announced that Dash 4 Cash races would feature two heat races that determine the starting grid for the main event. If a driver is the highest finishing eligible driver in two of the races, they become eligible for the Xfinity Chase.

Schedule

Schedule changes and notes
 Pocono Raceway will host the Xfinity Series for the first time on June 4, 2016. The race will be  in length and will replace the standalone June race held by Chicagoland Speedway.
 The four Dash4Cash races—Bristol, Richmond, Dover (all spring) and Indianapolis—will have reduced race distances in order to add additional heat races. The Bristol format is two 50-lap heat races and a 200-lap feature, Richmond will have 35-lap heat races and a 140-lap feature, Dover will have 40-lap heat races and a 120-lap feature and Indianapolis will have 20-lap heat races and a 60-lap feature.
 Due to NBCSN's coverage of the 2016 Summer Olympics, the Zippo 200 at The Glen was moved to CNBC and the Mid-Ohio 200 and Food City 300 to USA Network. The start of the Mid-Ohio race was moved to NBC Sports Live Extra due to USA's Olympic coverage overrunning.

Results and standings

Races

Drivers' Championship

(key) Bold – Pole position awarded by time. Italics – Pole position set by final practice results or owner's points. * – Most laps led.
. – Eliminated after Round of 12
. – Eliminated after Round of 8

Owners' championship (Top 15)
(key) Bold - Pole position awarded by time. Italics - Pole position set by final practice results or rainout. * – Most laps led.
. – Eliminated after Round of 12
. – Eliminated after Round of 8

Manufacturers' championship

See also
 2016 NASCAR Sprint Cup Series
 2016 NASCAR Camping World Truck Series
 2016 NASCAR K&N Pro Series East
 2016 NASCAR K&N Pro Series West
 2016 NASCAR Whelen Modified Tour
 2016 NASCAR Whelen Southern Modified Tour
 2016 NASCAR Pinty's Series
 2016 NASCAR Whelen Euro Series

Notes
  The Use Your Melon Drive Sober 200 at Dover International Speedway was postponed from October 1 to 2 because of inclement weather.
  The Drive for the Cure 300 at Charlotte Motor Speedway was postponed from October 7 to 9 because of Hurricane Matthew.

References

NASCAR Xfinity Series seasons